Bussi sul Tirino is a comune and town in the province of Pescara in the Abruzzo region of Italy. It is located in the Gran Sasso e Monti della Laga National Park.

See also
Castello Mediceo

 
Cities and towns in Abruzzo